Mesk Elil (مسك الليل night-blooming jasmine) is the third album of Souad Massi, the Algerian-born, Paris-based singer-songwriter, following her 2004 album Deb. The album peaked only at #56 on the French albums chart, but remained on the chart for almost ten months, and won Victoires de la Musique World music album of the year. Mauritanian vocalist :fr:Daby Touré, :fr:Pascal Danaë, a French-born musician of Caribbean ancestry and Mino Cinelu on percussion are a few of the artists appearing on the recording.

Track listings
 Mesk Elil
 Kilyoum
 Ilham
 Khalouni
 Denia Wezmen
 Tell Me Why
 Miwawa
 Dar Djedi
 Malou
 Hagda wela kter 
The French release booklet, 9837339, contains French translations only, but no Arabic sung texts.

References

2005 albums
Souad Massi albums